Rodrigo Alves da Cruz (born 10 September 1995), commonly known as Pelezinho, is a Brazilian footballer who currently plays as a forward for Cianorte.

Career statistics

Club

Honours
Cianorte
Campeonato Paranaense 2ª Divisão: 2016

References

External links

1996 births
Living people
Brazilian footballers
Association football forwards
Campeonato Brasileiro Série A players
Campeonato Brasileiro Série B players
Campeonato Brasileiro Série D players
Cianorte Futebol Clube players
Brusque Futebol Clube players
Clube Náutico Marcílio Dias players
Associação Chapecoense de Futebol players
Clube Atlético Tubarão players
Esporte Clube Bahia players
Grêmio Esportivo Brasil players